Nguyễn Thị Doan (born 8 November 1951) is a Vietnamese educator, former legislator and  Vietnamese politician, who served as Vice President of Vietnam from 2007 to 2016. Nguyễn Thị Doan is a member of the Central Committee of the Communist Party of Vietnam, and a deputy to the National Assembly of Vietnam for Hà Nam Province.

Nguyễn Thị Doan is a former university professor of economics. The National Assembly elected her as the Vice President, and she served from 2007 to 2016.

Nguyễn Thị Doan was born on November 1, 1951, in the northern province of Hà Nam. She entered Hanoi University of Commerce for her degree in economics in 1977 and graduated in 1979. In the same year, Mrs. Doan became a lecturer of the university. She went to Bulgaria (Ph.D. in economics in University of National and World Economy) and France (Ph.D. in business administration) for graduate studies. In 1982, she joined the Communist Party of Vietnam. Shortly after returning to Vietnam, she was appointed as the Rector of Hanoi University of Commerce.

At the Eighth National Congress of the Communist Party of Vietnam in June 1996, Nguyễn Thị Doan was elected to the Party's Central Committee and became a member of the Central Committee's Supervisory Commission three years later. She was re-elected to the Party's Central Committee again in the Ninth and Tenth Congresses and served as the Permanent Deputy Chairman of the Supervisory Commission. She was named Vice-President of the Socialist Republic of Vietnam at the first session of the Twelfth National Assembly on July 25, 2007.

References

1951 births
Living people
Vice presidents of Vietnam
Members of the National Assembly (Vietnam)
Members of the 8th Central Committee of the Communist Party of Vietnam
Members of the 9th Central Committee of the Communist Party of Vietnam
Members of the 10th Central Committee of the Communist Party of Vietnam
Members of the 11th Central Committee of the Communist Party of Vietnam
People from Hà Nam Province
21st-century Vietnamese women politicians
21st-century Vietnamese politicians
University of National and World Economy alumni
Women vice presidents
21st-century Vietnamese women